Symphoricarpos vaccinioides (Roundleaf Snowberry) is a North American species of flowering plant in the honeysuckle family. It had been found in western Canada (British Columbia) and in the western United States (Washington, Oregon, California, Nevada, Idaho, Utah, Montana, Wyoming, Colorado).

Symphoricarpos vaccinioides is an erect branching shrub sometimes as much as 150 cm (5 feet) tall,. Leaves are up to 2 cm (0.8 inch) long, dark green on the upper surface but lighter green underneath. It has pink, bell-shaped flowers and white fruits.

References

External links

vaccinioides
Plants described in 1900
Flora of British Columbia
Flora of the Western United States
Flora without expected TNC conservation status